The Man Not The Dawg is the debut solo studio album by American rapper Khujo Goodie. It was released on November 5, 2002 via A To Z Records. Production was handled by Mark Twain, Frank Nitti, Chris and Scott, Whild Peach, and Ed X, with Arlinda Garrett and Khujo serving as executive producers. It features guest appearances from Mark Twayne, Whild Peach, Goodie Mob, Lil' Will, Mr. Murder, Slip Matola, South West Armstrong and Witchdoctor. The album peaked at number 96 on the US Billboard Top R&B/Hip-Hop Albums chart.

Track listing

Charts

References

External links

2002 debut albums
Dungeon Family albums